Douglas Palm (born 6 May 1951) is a former professional tennis player from Sweden.

Early life 
Douglas Boson Palm was born on 6 May 1951 in Malmköping, Sweden. 

He is the third son of Boson Palm who died 1976 of ALS and his wife Ingrid Palm. 

His brothers are Kjell Palm and Björn-Ulf Palm.

Biography
Douglas Palm was a quarter-finalist at the Copenhagen Open in 1976. Later in the year he upset Mark Edmondson in the 1976 Swedish Open, then in the 1976 Stockholm Open held a match point in the second round against Mark Cox, who went on to win the tournament.

A Swedish Davis Cup representative, Palm was picked to play for his country in a tie against Monaco in Uppsala in April, 1977. He featured in the doubles rubber with Jan Norbäck, which they won over Bernard Balleret and Louis Borfiga, to secure the tie.

Palm made his first singles appearance in the main draw of a Grand Slam tournament at the 1977 Wimbledon Championships. He beat West German player Frank Gebert in the opening round, then lost a five set second round match to Paul Kronk.

After making a Grand Prix quarter-final, at Maui, Palm ended the 1977 season by competing in the December edition of the Australian Open (there had also been a tournament in January). On this occasion he was unable to get past the first round and lasted only one set against Alvin Gardiner before he had to retire hurt.

Palm returned to Wimbledon in 1978 and lost to Buster Mottram in opening round. The match was played before a large police presence due to demonstrators who had turned up to protest against Mottram's support of the National Front Party. He also competed in men's doubles at the French Open, Wimbledon and US Open during his career, all with Jan Norbäck.

His best performance in a Grand Prix tournament came at Linz in 1979, when he had wins over Patrice Dominguez, Markus Günthardt and Louk Sanders to make the semi-finals. That year he also won the men's doubles title with Tenny Svensson at the Scandinavian Indoor Championships, a tournament not part of the circuit.

Personal life 
He lived a long time in Germany near the city of Stuttgart. 
After his career he was a highly passionate and well known tennis coach at the WTB (Württembergischer Tennisbund) and coached several young players on their way to a professional career. 

He was married and has 2 adult children.

After his divorce in 2002 he lived with his longtime girlfriend in Nürtingen and Ludwigsburg near Stuttgart / Germany.
In his 50s and 60s he was part of the „Herren 50“ tennis team in Nürtingen‘s tennis club ETV Nürtingen where he played against several other clubs in Baden-Württemberg. 

Since 2007 Palm is back living in Sweden.

See also
List of Sweden Davis Cup team representatives

References

External links
 
 
 

 ETV  Nürtingen Tennisclub

 Malmköping Hometown

1951 births
Living people
Swedish male tennis players
20th-century Swedish people